Sgt. Pepper Live is a performance by the American rock band Cheap Trick with a full orchestra, released on August 25, 2009, in commemoration of the 42nd anniversary of the release of the historic album Sgt. Pepper's Lonely Hearts Club Band by the Beatles. Both a live album and a companion DVD of the performance were released. The album was engineered by Geoff Emerick. Cheap Trick performed the "Sgt. Pepper Live" show  at the Las Vegas Hilton for two weeks in September 2009.

Cheap Trick members performing
 Robin Zander: lead vocals, rhythm guitar
 Rick Nielsen: lead guitar, backing vocals
 Tom Petersson: bass, backing vocals
 Bun E. Carlos: drums, percussion
 w/ Magic Cristian: keyboards, backing vocals
 Danny Louis from Gov't Mule: special guest keyboardist

Special guests (at Las Vegas Hilton 9/09)
 Joan Osborne lead vocal on "Lovely Rita"
 Ian Ball lead vocal on "When I'm Sixty-Four"
 Bill Lloyd
 Rob Laufer

Band (at Las Vegas Hilton 9/09)
Todd Youth: bass
Karl Rosqvist: drums

Orchestra members performing on the album
(as listed in the album credits)

Steve Armour, Laura Bontrager, Dibyarka Chatterjee, Tom Christiansen, Nicenovia Cummins, Stephanie Cummins, Glen Drewes, Netanel Druiblate, Eric Fraser, Prateek Haldar, Craig Johnson, Chris Komer, Bill Lloyd, David Mann, John Miller, Jeff Nelson, Chris Parker, Patrick Pridemore, John Putnam, Maxine Roach, Glen Roven, Dave Sharma, Samita Sinha, Liah-Wen Ting, Una Tone & Belinda Whitney

Track listing

"Sgt. Pepper Live" concerts also included the band performing a few of their own biggest hits live as well, including "Dream Police" and "I Want You To Want Me". Also, a number of the live performances (particularly the later ones at the Paris Las Vegas) did not feature Bun E. Carlos on drums, but rather, Rick Nielsen's son Daxx.

Chart performance

References 

The Beatles tribute albums
Cheap Trick live albums
2009 video albums
Live video albums
2009 live albums
Albums recorded at Westgate Las Vegas